Devonport FC may refer to:

 Devonport City FC, an Australian soccer team
 Devonport Football Club, an Australian rules football team